Children of Darkness is a 1983 American documentary film on PBS produced by Ara Chekmayan and Richard Kotuk. It was nominated for an Academy Award for Best Documentary Feature.

It is about mentally ill and emotionally troubled children and young adults living in various private and public residences, state institutions, such as Elan School in Poland, Maine a  Long Island ( state run ) institution and South Beach in New York psychiatric hospital. It had interviews with various parents, including ones whose children died under suspicious circumstances while in custody as well as with various staff members who work with people who will carry their disabilities and illnesses all their lives, and the staff's awareness of their inability to cure them.

One of the drugs that caused patient deaths in the South Beach hospital is mesoridazine, which was withdrawn from the United States market in 2004 due to dangerous heart side effects. The Élan School closed in 2011 due to criticism of its alleged treatment of patients.

References

External links

, posted by Richard Kotuk Archives

1983 films
1983 documentary films
American documentary films
1980s English-language films
1980s American films